James Wyche (born April 19, 1982) is a former American football defensive end. He was drafted by the Jacksonville Jaguars in the seventh round of the 2006 NFL Draft. He played college football at Syracuse.

Wyche has also been a member of the St. Louis Rams, Houston Texans, and Seattle Seahawks.

Early years
Wyche attended Roosevelt High School, and was All-state and Newsday All-Long Island selection. He finished career with 162 tackles, 34 sacks, two blocked punts and two interceptions as a two-year starter. He played tight end as a senior and recorded 11 receptions for 372 yards and six touchdowns.

College career
Wyche, four-year starter, attended Syracuse University and played for the Syracuse Orange football, while with the Orange he had a total of 136 tackles, 69 assists, 13.5 sacks, 5 forced fumbles. He started all 11 games as a senior and made 58 tackles and led team with four forced fumbles. He totaled 68 tackles and 5.5 sacks as a junior. As a sophomore, he started all 12 games and finished with 37 tackles, four tackles for loss and two sacks. He played in nine games as a redshirt freshman and made 40 tackles, 4.5 tackles for loss and 1.5 sacks. He earned a degree in child family studies.

Wyche wore #90 as a member of the Orange.

Professional career

Pre-draft

Jacksonville Jaguars
Wyche was selected by the Jacksonville Jaguars in Round 7 pick 213 of the 2006 NFL Draft. In 2006, he spent first 10 weeks on practice squad before being activated to 53-man roster on November 15, 2006. On September 1, 2007, Wyche was placed on the injured reserve with a groin injury. In 2008, he missed the entire season with a knee injury suffered in the preseason and was placed on injured reserve on August 9, 2008.

Wyche was waived on September 17, 2009 and was re-signed to the practice squad on November 24. On December 3, he was promoted to the active roster. He made his NFL debut ten days later, recording one tackle against the Miami Dolphins. Wyche was waived again on December 19.

St. Louis Rams
Wyche was claimed off waivers by the St. Louis Rams on December 21, 2009. Wyche was released by the Rams on June 29, 2010.

Houston Texans
Wyche signed with the Houston Texans on August 17, 2010. He was released on August 24.

Seattle Seahawks
Wyche signed with the Seattle Seahawks on August 31, 2010.  He was released on September 4 and later signed to the team's practice squad.  Wyche was released on November 23, 2010 from the practice squad.

References

External links
Jacksonville Jaguars bio
Syracuse Orange bio

1982 births
Living people
American football defensive ends
Houston Texans players
Jacksonville Jaguars players
People from Roosevelt, New York
Players of American football from New York (state)
Seattle Seahawks players
Sportspeople from Nassau County, New York
St. Louis Rams players
Syracuse Orange football players